Fengqi Subdistrict is a subdistrict in Luochuan County, Yan'an, Shaanxi, China. According to the 2010 Chinese Census, Fengqi had a population of 55,096 in 2010.

History 
Present-day Fengqi Subdistrict was once known as Chengguan, which was created as a people's commune in 1958.

Chengguan was changed to a town in 1964. The town was renamed to Fengqi in 1984.

The subdistrict was established in 2015 when the former town of Fengqi was upgraded to a subdistrict.

Administrative divisions 
As of 2020, Fengqi Subdistrict administers 6 residential communities and 20 administrative villages.

Residential communities 
The subdistrict's 6 residential communities are as follows:

 Nanguan Community
 Jiefang Road Community
 Dongguan Community
 Beiguan Community
 Zhongxin Street Community
 South Street Community

Administrative villages 
The subdistrict's 20 administrative villages are as follows:

 Dongguan Village
 East Street Village
 North Street Village
 West Street Village
 Xiguan Village
 Houzitou Village
 Hu Village
 Xibeixing Village
 Luo Village
 Chewang Village
 Heimu Village
 Zuoshan Village
 Guju Village
 Qiaoxi Village
 Lubai Village
 Anmin Village
 Haoyin Village
 Jiang Village
 Fengyuan Village
 Luohe Village

Demographics 
The 2010 Chinese Census recorded Fengqi as having a population of 55,096, up from the population of 21,060 recorded in the 2000 Chinese Census. Fengqi had an estimated population of 19,000 in 1996.

Transportation 
The subdistrict is served by the G65 Baotou-Maoming Expressway, National Highway 210, and Shaanxi Provincial Highway 304.

References 

Township-level divisions of Shaanxi
Yan'an